Oweina (Owena, often misspelled "Owenia"), or Waisara, after the two villages in which it is spoken, is a Kainantu language of Papua New Guinea.

References

Kainantu–Goroka languages
Languages of Eastern Highlands Province